Scabricola potensis is a species of sea snail, a marine gastropod mollusc in the family Mitridae, the miters or miter snails.

Description
The length of the shell attains 24.5 mm.

Distribution
This marine species occurs off New Caledonia.

References

 Cernohorsky W.O. (1991). The Mitridae of the world. Part 2. The subfamily Mitrinae concluded and subfamilies Imbricariinae and Cylindromitrinae. Monographs of Marine Mollusca. 4: ii + 164 pp.
 Poppe G.T. & Tagaro S.P. (2008). Mitridae. Pp. 330-417, in: G.T. Poppe (ed.), Philippine marine mollusks, volume 2. Hackenheim: ConchBooks. 848 pp

External links
 Montrouzier [X.. (1858). Descriptions d'espèces nouvelles de l'Archipel Calédonien (2è article). Journal de Conchyliologie. 7: 373-375]
 Fedosov A., Puillandre N., Herrmann M., Kantor Yu., Oliverio M., Dgebuadze P., Modica M.V. & Bouchet P. (2018). The collapse of Mitra: molecular systematics and morphology of the Mitridae (Gastropoda: Neogastropoda). Zoological Journal of the Linnean Society. 183(2): 253-337

Mitridae
Gastropods described in 1858